At the 1924 Summer Olympics thirteen wrestling events were contested, all for men. There were six weight classes in Greco-Roman wrestling and seven classes in freestyle wrestling. The Greco-Roman events were held from July 6 to July 10, 1924 and the freestyle competitions were held from July 11 to July 14, 1924.

Medal summary

Freestyle

Greco-Roman

Participating nations
A total of 229 wrestlers from 26 nations competed at the Paris Games.

Medal table

References

 
1924 Summer Olympics events
1924